Manners Sutton is a civil parish in York County, New Brunswick, Canada.

For governance purposes it is divided between the village of Harvey and the local service district of the parish of Manners Sutton, both of which are members of the Southwest New Brunswick Service Commission (SNBSC).

Origin of name
The parish was named in honour of John Manners-Sutton, 3rd Viscount Canterbury, Lieutenant Governor of New Brunswick at the time. Canterbury Parish was erected at the same time.

History
Manners Sutton was erected in 1855 from Kingsclear and Prince William Parishes.

Boundaries
Manners Sutton Parish is bounded:

 on the northeast by a line beginning on the eastern shore of Lake George and running south 45º east along the northeastern line a grant to John Hood on the western side of Route 640 and along the southwestern boundary of Hanwell until it strikes the northwestern line of New Maryland Parish, about 5.2 kilometres past Route 640;
 on the southeast by the northwestern line of New Maryland Parish, which parallels the Sunbury County line;
 on the south by the Charlotte County line;
 on the northwest by a line beginning about 3.8 kilometres east of Route 3 on the Charlotte County line, then running northeasterly parallel to the Sunbury County line to the starting point on Lake George.

Communities
Communities at least partly within the parish. bold indicates an incorporated municipality; italics indicate a name no longer in official use

 Acton
  Brockway
 Christie Ridge
 Coburn
 Cork
 Frog Lake
  Harvey (PO Harvey Station)
 Harvey Settlement
 Hurley Corner
 Manners Sutton
 Prince William Station
 Roach
 South Tweedside
 Swans Shore
 Thomaston Corner
 Tweedside
 Upper Brockway
 Upper Mills
 Wilmot
 York Mills

Bodies of water
Bodies of water at least partly within the parish.

 Magaguadavic River
 Harvey Lake Thoroughfare
 Lyons Stream
 Yoho Stream
 Gardner Creek
 Jewetts Creek
 Frog Lake
  Lake George
 Grieve Lake
 Holland Lake
 Mud Lake
 Oromocto Lake
 Stephenson Lake

Islands
Islands at least partly within the parish.

 Birch Island
 Cedar Islands
 Jackknife Islands
 Kelly Island
 Pine Island
 Ship Island
 Spruce Island

Other notable places
Parks, historic sites, and other noteworthy places at least partly within the parish.
 Briggs & Little
 Brockway Airport

Demographics
Parish population total does not include  Harvey

Population
Population trend

Language
Mother tongue (2016)

See also
List of parishes in New Brunswick

Notes

References

Parishes of York County, New Brunswick
Local service districts of York County, New Brunswick
1855 establishments in the British Empire